BBC Radio York is the BBC's local radio station serving the county of North Yorkshire.

It broadcasts on FM, DAB, digital TV and via BBC Sounds from studios in the Bootham area of York.

According to RAJAR, the station has a weekly audience of 59,000 listeners and a 3.6% share as of December 2022.

Early history 

In May 1982, just over a year before the station was due to launch, a temporary service was provided to cover Pope John Paul II's visit to York. The service, which ran for just over 24 hours, operated on what was to be the station's primary MW frequency and was also broadcast on the other local stations in the Yorkshire region.

The station was launched at 6:30am on 4 July 1983, and featured on the cover of the Radio Times.

The first station manager was John Jefferson with the late Tony Fish as Programme Organiser. The original team included David Farwig, Derm Tanner, Andy Joynson, David Thomas, Will Hanrahan, Graham Pass, Nik Wood (Scarborough Producer), Diane Myers (Harrogate Producer), Andy Hitchcock, Chris Loveder, Chris Choi, Charlotte Counsel, Shirley Lewis and Sandy Barton.

Initially, the station was only on air for a few hours a day -  (6:30am to 1pm and 4pm to 6pm during the week with weekend programming restricted to 8am until around 2pm) and carried BBC Radio 2 the rest of the time. At first, local sports coverage was produced by BBC Radio Leeds. During the second half of the 1980s, broadcast hours slowly expanded. Afternoon broadcasting was introduced and programming started earlier in the day - 6am during the week and 7am over the weekend. Radio York also started producing its own sports programmes on Saturday afternoons but did not introduce its own Sunday afternoon programming until the end of the decade.

Evening programming started in August 1986, when Radio York joined with the other BBC local stations in Yorkshire in broadcasting an early evening service of specialist music programmes. May 1989 saw the launch of BBC Night Network - a group of BBC Local Radio stations in the North of England which featured networked programming every evening. This provided BBC Radio York with evening programming, keeping the station on air until midnight seven days a week, extended until 12:30am in the early 1990s, and to 1am by the end of that decade. One of those shows, Late Night North with David Dunning, often aired from the York studios and in 2002 the BBC's Yorkshire stations, including Radio York, parted from the network to bring back a phone-in with Alex Hall, who had hosted a similar show on Pulse, as presenter. Other programming included Martin Kelner's Late Thing.  The Early Show from BBC Radio Humberside (within the BBC Yorkshire and Lincolnshire region) was also carried.

BBC Radio York was not the first radio station broadcasting in York. University Radio York, the oldest independent legal radio station, is the University of York's student radio station and before the BBC, URY was named Radio York. The independent commercial rival, Minster FM, began broadcasting on 4 July 1992. Stray FM, the independent station covering the Harrogate and Ripon areas, made its first transmission exactly two years to the day after Minster's launch and eleven years to the day after Radio York's launch.

Technical 

BBC Radio York broadcasts from its studios in York on 95.5 (Oliver's Mount, Scarborough), 103.7 (Acklam Wold transmitter near Leavening, midway between York and Malton) and 104.3 (Woolmoor, near Upsall four miles north of Thirsk close to the A19 - for Harrogate, Northallerton and the Yorkshire Dales) FM, and online from their website. Until 24 February 2020, BBC Radio York also broadcast on MW - 666 (Fulford) and 1260 (Row Brow, Scarborough) AM. The transmitters were closed as a cost-cutting measure.

Acklam Wold is the strongest frequency on 103.7 which is for Ryedale and the Vale of York, and the 140 ft transmitter also has the commercial station, Greatest Hits Radio York and North Yorkshire on 104.7. The 103.7 signal can be heard as far south as Mansfield on the M1, and can be received in West and South Yorkshire. However, in the early days Radio York's FM frequencies were 90.2 FM and 97.2. The Olivers Mount transmitter also transmits Greatest Hits Radio Yorkshire Coast on 96.2, as well as television and national radio frequencies. The Woolmoor transmitter has national radio frequencies.

Much of BBC York's studio infrastructure was the original Mk3 installation, dating from the station's inception in 1983.  This ageing equipment had become unreliable, causing the station to "fall off air" regularly.  Because the refurbishment required was significant, it would not be possible to continue to broadcast from the existing premised during the refurbishment, and no suitable alternative premises could be identified.  Therefore, plans were drawn up for BBC York to move in with BBC Leeds temporarily and to retain a presence in North Yorkshire through the BBC Bus, and through increased contributions from district studios in Harrogate and Scarborough. BBC York has since completed refurbishment of studio equipment and news room.

DAB licence 

The DAB licence that BBC Radio York uses covers North Yorkshire from transmitters at Acklam Wold, Oliver's Mount, Harrogate Hilderbrand and Bilsdale. The licence was advertised in June 2007 and was awarded to MuxCo, in September 2007. It was supposed be ready in June 2009, then revised to December 2009. Finally, the North Yorkshire DAB multiplex launched on 17 December 2014.

In addition, the station also broadcasts on Freeview TV channel 720 in the BBC Yorkshire region and streams online via BBC Sounds.

Programming
Local programming is produced and broadcast from the BBC's York studios from 6am - 10pm each day. The station's Sunday evening output also airs on BBC Radio Humberside and BBC Radio Lincolnshire. 

The current weekday daytime presenters are Georgey Spanswick from 0600 to 1000, Jonathan Cowap from 1000 to 1400 and Joanita Musisi from 1400 to 1800. 

Off-peak programming, including the regional late show (10pm - 1am), originates from BBC Radio Leeds.

During the station's downtime, BBC Radio York simulcasts overnight programming from BBC Radio 5 Live and BBC Radio Leeds.

News, Sport and Weather
BBC Radio York provides hourly local news and sport bulletins and weather forecasts every half-hour from 6am until 6pm on weekdays. On weekends, local news and weather airs hourly from 7am until 1pm.

Notable former presenters 

Former presenters at the station include ITV Sport commentator Jon Champion and Sky Sports commentator Rob Hawthorne and Will Hanrahan, who went on to present Look North and report for Good Morning with Anne and Nick. Victor Lewis-Smith started his BBC career here, presenting his chat and music programme, Snooze Button, on Sunday mornings in 1984. Countdown host Richard Whiteley made several guest appearances in the early 2000s. The Grand Tour front-man Richard Hammond was also once a presenter.

Awards 
In 2001 BBC Radio York won the Sony Radio Academy Gold Award for Community Service for "Floodwatch News" - its coverage of the floods that hit the county of North Yorkshire in November 2000.

In 2002 BBC Radio York was awarded Silver in the News Programme category for The Great Heck Rail Crash: Countdown To A Tragedy (BBC Radio York) 

In 2011 BBC Radio York's news team won the Gillard award for Original Journalism. The awards are given out each year and are open to the entire BBC local radio network.

In 2012, the flagship breakfast show, Adam Tomlinson at Breakfast, was nominated for a Sony award for Breakfast Show of the Year.

In 2013, presenter Jonathan Cowap won Gold at the annual Frank Gillard Awards for Best Hotseat interview.

In 2014, Gillard Gold Award for Faith-based programming

In 2016 Georgey at Breakfast won Best Breakfast Show at the Local Radio Awards

References

External links 
 BBC Radio York
 Media UK - BBC Radio York
 History of local radio in Yorkshire.
 David's Transmitter World
 Acklam Wold transmitter.
 Fulford transmitter.
 Olivers Mount transmitter.
 Row Brow transmitter.
 Woolmoor transmitter.

York
North Yorkshire
Mass media in York
Radio stations in Yorkshire
Radio stations established in 1983
1983 establishments in England